"Ignoreland" is the eighth track from R.E.M.'s studio album Automatic for the People. The song was only released as a promo single, but had chart positions on the Modern Rock and Mainstream Rock charts. "Ignoreland" is the sixth song by R.E.M. to be released as a promo single while having a chart position. The previous song unreleased with a chart position by the band was a cover of Leonard Cohen's "First We Take Manhattan", which was released as a B-side to "Drive".

Details 
The song's lyrical content is explicitly political, referring to the conditions of the United States during the Presidencies of Jimmy Carter, Ronald Reagan, and George H. W. Bush.

Mike Mills said: "Michael's rolling against Republican politics. The opening line is, 'These bastards stole all the power from the victims of the us v. them years / Wrecking all things virtuous and true'. And the last verse is really great – 'I know that this is vitriol, no solution, spleen-venting / But I feel better having screamed. Don't you?' It's really great."

"You need headphones to get all the words, but they're understandable," said Peter Buck. "Michael's singing through an amp on that. He wanted to get that cold anger in his voice that you get with natural distortion. And the song is written in Neil Young's tuning. Not that he owns it. But the Es are tuned down to D, like in 'Cinnamon Girl'. I admit it, he's the one I learned that tuning from."

The band members have been quoted as saying that they were not entirely happy with the production of the song on the album, and the song was not played live during subsequent tours. The song made its live debut almost 16 years after its album release at the opening show for the band's final tour Accelerate in Vancouver, BC on May 23, 2008.

The song has been described by Matt Neal as "hair metal-ish".

Charts

References

1992 songs
Protest songs
R.E.M. songs
Songs written by Bill Berry
Songs written by Peter Buck
Songs written by Mike Mills
Songs written by Michael Stipe
Song recordings produced by Michael Stipe
Song recordings produced by Scott Litt
Song recordings produced by Bill Berry
Song recordings produced by Peter Buck
Song recordings produced by Mike Mills
Warner Records singles